Whitelock is a surname and place name.

People
Thomas Whitelock Kempthorne (1834–1915), New Zealand manufacturing chemist and businessman
Henry Whitelock Torrens (1806–1852), son of Major Henry Torrens
Adam Whitelock (born 1987), New Zealand rugby union footballer
Dorothy Whitelock (1901–1982), English historian
George Whitelock (born 1986), rugby union player
Loran Whitelock, American botanist who specializes in Cycads
Luke Whitelock (born 1991), New Zealand rugby union footballer
Sam Whitelock (born 1988), New Zealand born rugby player

Places
Reservoir Hill, Baltimore, a residential neighborhood in Baltimore, Maryland, USA, which is also known as Whitelock

See also
Uncle John & Whitelock, 'horror blues' band from Glasgow
Whitelocke
Whitlock (disambiguation)